Patty Pottle is a Canadian politician in Newfoundland and Labrador. She represented the district of Torngat Mountains in the Newfoundland and Labrador House of Assembly from 2007 to 2011. She was a member of the Progressive Conservative Party and served as Minister of Aboriginal Affairs in the provincial government. She was defeated in the 2011 provincial election.

Pottle is a businesswoman and former educator who owns DJ's Gift Shop and Amaguk Inn, located in Hopedale; along with Big Land Grocery in Hopedale and Makkovik.

Election results

|-

|-

|-

|NDP
|Alex Saunders
|align="right"|186
|align="right"|12.27%
|align="right"|
|}

|-

|-

|-

|}

References

External links
 Patty Pottle's PC Party biography

Members of the Executive Council of Newfoundland and Labrador
Progressive Conservative Party of Newfoundland and Labrador MHAs
Living people
Year of birth missing (living people)
Women MHAs in Newfoundland and Labrador
Canadian Inuit women
Inuit politicians
People from Happy Valley-Goose Bay
21st-century Canadian politicians
21st-century Canadian women politicians
Women government ministers of Canada
Inuit from Newfoundland and Labrador